The 1982 Toronto Argonauts finished in first place in the East Division with a 9–6–1 record. They appeared in the Grey Cup.

Offseason

Regular season

Standings

Schedule

Postseason

Grey Cup

Awards and honours
CFL's Most Outstanding Player Award – Condredge Holloway (QB), Toronto Argonauts
CFL's Coach of the Year – Bob O'Billovich, Toronto Argonauts

1982 CFL All-Stars
Terry Greer, Wide Receiver
Zac Henderson, Defensive Back

1982 Eastern All-Stars
QB – Condredge Holloway, Toronto Argonauts
RB – Cedric Minter, Toronto Argonauts
WR – Terry Greer, Toronto Argonauts
LB – John Pointer, Toronto Argonauts
DB – Zac Henderson, Toronto Argonauts

References

Toronto Argonauts seasons
James S. Dixon Trophy championship seasons
1982 Canadian Football League season by team